The Polly Klaas Foundation is a 501(c)(3) public charity organization devoted to preventing crimes against children, assisting in the recovery of missing children, and lobbying for legislative assistance. The foundation was formed October 23, 1993, to search for Polly Klaas.  Its executive director is Robert De Leo.  It has expanded its mission and now searches for many missing children.

The Polly Klaas Foundation also provides kits for parents to teach abduction prevention in a way that they state is not frightening for children.  It distributes over 100,000 of these kits per year.

The Polly Klaas Foundation worked with Convio to send targeted letters to state and federal officials to implement Amber Alerts in all 50 states.

Polly's father, Marc, is not associated with this foundation. However, her mother, Eve Nichol, serves on the board.

History
The Polly Klaas Foundation was created initially to search for Polly Klaas. After two years, the executive director, Gary Kinley, resigned with no explanation, and there was an analysis of financial problems in 1996.  The Polly Klaas Foundation has since recovered and has drastically increased its operating budget.

The Polly Klaas Foundation receives the majority of its donations via donated cars, through a partnership with Harvard Palmer Jr.'s Vehicle Donation Processing Center.

Children
The missing children featured by the Polly Klaas Foundation include:
Jacob Wetterling
Kiplyn Davis
Jessica Cain
Erica Fraysure
Jennipher Gingery
Kasey Shepard

Other people
Michelle Le, nursing student. Search efforts were supported by the foundation.

See also
 Megan Nicole Kanka Foundation
 Laura Recovery Center, Samantha Runnion
 Elizabeth Smart
 Dru Sjodin
 Dr. Chris Hatcher — criminal profiler
 Murder of Adam Walsh

References

External links
Official site

Foundations based in the United States
Children's charities based in the United States
Organizations established in 1993
Missing people organizations